is a Japanese female badminton player.

Achievements

BWF Grand Prix 
The BWF Grand Prix has two level such as Grand Prix Gold and Grand Prix. It is a series of badminton tournaments, sanctioned by Badminton World Federation (BWF) since 2007.

Women's Doubles

 BWF Grand Prix Gold tournament
 BWF Grand Prix tournament

BWF International Challenge/Series
Women's Doubles

 BWF International Challenge tournament
 BWF International Series tournament
 BWF Future Series tournament

References

External links
 

Japanese female badminton players
1995 births
Living people
Sportspeople from Nara Prefecture
21st-century Japanese women